The E-Flexer is a class of Chinese-built Ro-Pax ferries ordered by Stena RoRo for European line service.  Twelve vessels of the class are on order, and upon delivery will be operated by Stena Line, Brittany Ferries, DFDS Seaways and Marine Atlantic. Stena Line are to take five vessels of the class, Brittany Ferries five (four powered by LNG, two of which will also be hybrid electric), and a single vessel each to DFDS and Marine Atlantic,  of which the latter's vessel will also be hybrid electric. All of the vessels will be delivered to Stena RoRo with the Stena Line vessels transferred to that company and the Brittany Ferries, DFDS and Marine Atlantic examples long-term chartered to those operators, with an option to purchase at the end of the charter.

History
Following about two years of design work, Stena ordered the first four vessels of the class from Chinese shipbuilder AVIC Weihai in April 2016, with options for four more ships.  Stena originally planned to utilize the four ferries on Irish Sea services out of Belfast, but later agreed to charter the third ship in the series to Brittany Ferries.  In February 2018, the keel was laid for the first ship, with her delivery scheduled for early 2020.  Stena RoRo ordered a fifth ship in April 2018, which will enter service with DFDS Seaways on a ten-year charter upon delivery. The following month, Stena RoRo ordered a sixth ship, to be placed with Brittany Ferries on a ten-year charter beginning in late 2021.  Construction on the second ship in the class began in June 2018. In July, Stena Line ordered two more ships, accounting for all the options in the original 2016 order, while Stena RoRo announced that it had agreed to take new options for four more vessels.

Service
The first ship in the class, named Stena Estrid, was launched in January 2019 and was delivered in China on 15 November. On arrival in Holyhead, faulty seals on over 20 windows were discovered. Repairs were carried out prior to her maiden voyage, which took place on 13 January 2020. She is regularly operated on Stena's route between Holyhead and Dublin.

Stena Edda, the second E-flexer earmarked for Stena Line's fleet, was delivered to Stena RoRo on 15 January 2020. Following bunkering in Singapore and Gibraltar, and an outside port limits call at Galle, the crew travelling from Weihai were also checked by local authorities for coronavirus infection, with no evidence of the disease being present. She entered service on Stena's route between Belfast and Liverpool, where Stena Embla, the fourth ship of the series, is planned to operate upon her delivery in early 2021.

Galicia was delivered on 3 September 2020, with her entry into service expected in 2021. She will operate out of Portsmouth, England, to Santander, Spain and Cherbourg, France. Brittany Ferries plans to take delivery of Salamanca in 2022, followed by Santoña in 2023. On the 20th July 2021, Brittany Ferries announced that 2 more E-Flexer ships are due to enter service between 2024 and 2025, replacing Bretagne and Normandie. These will be ships 11 and 12.

The fifth ship in the series, operated by DFDS, is called Côte d'Opale. She differs significantly from the other E-Flexer vessels as she has additional public spaces in areas where passenger cabins are located on the Stena Line and Brittany Ferries ships. The drastic changes from the rest of the E-Flexer class come about from the fact that she is running on the Dover-Calais cross-channel service, which is a short crossing - only taking 90 minutes from Dover to Calais.
On August 4, 2021, the Côte d'Opale entered service, replacing DFDS's older 1991 Boelwerf-built Calais Seaways.

The day after Brittany Ferries ordered two additional E-Flexers, Marine Atlantic ordered an E-Flexer.

Design

E-Flexer-class ships were designed by Stena and Deltamarin. The basic concept of the E-Flexer follows a standardised design using (by default configuration) one full passenger deck, two mixed use decks, and two full-length garages for road traffic, plus a smaller garage in the ship's lower hull. Ships of the class are powered by two engines instead of four, which is said to reduce fuel consumption alongside a specialised hull design.

Those engines are designed to be compatible with liquefied natural gas (LNG) fuel after modifications. Brittany Ferries' second and third (Salamanca and Santoña) ships will be modified to be capable of running on LNG from delivery, though both will have reduced freight capacity as a result of the space occupied by their LNG tanks. All of the E-Flexer ships ordered to date will be ice-classed, either to 1A or 1C requirements.

Subclasses

Stena Line (standard)
The standard Stenas, ships #1-#3 (Stena Estrid, Edda and Embla), are the first ships of E-Flexers delivered, with all being delivered between 2019 and 2020. They have a fully-passenger Deck 8 (upper deck) and partial -passenger Deck 7. Deck 7 houses a restaurant overlooking the bow of the ship, with a car garage to the stern. Deck 8 houses numerous amenities at the bow, with the stern section housing passenger cabins.

Stena Line (extended)
The extended Stenas are ships #7 and #8 (Stena Estelle, Stena Ebba) of the class. With the extension in the ship's length, lane space is increased by 500 lane metres to 3600lm. Stena Ebba is not to confused with Stena Edda which is smaller sister ship in the preceding standard E-Flexer class.

Brittany Ferries (standard)
The standard Brittany Ferries (Galicia, Salamanca and Santoña) follow a very similar design to Stenas Estrid, Edda and Embla, with the chief differences being an extended superstructure and with the Deck 7 car deck being cut in favour of passenger cabins, turning Deck 7 into a full passenger deck. Salamanca and Santoña will be capable of running on liquefied natural gas from launch, while the Galicia will be able to convert at a later date. Due to LNG tanks taking up some lane metres on the latter two, lane metres on the combined two decks will be reduced from 3100lm to 2758lm.

Brittany Ferries (shortened)
Two E-Flexers (Saint-Malo and another ship codenamed Normandie II), will be built to the shortened specification. These are shortened to  length in order to comply with St. Malo harbour restrictions. Saint-Malo is due to replace the 1989 Bretagne while the Normandie II will replace the 1992 Normandie. Normandie II will follow a similar layout to the standard Brittanies, while Saint-Malo will sacrifice additional lane metres for cabin space. Normandie II will have some 2100lm of garage space, with the Saint-Malo instead using 1100lm. Uniquely, these two ships will be hybrid electric, with capability of sailing out of harbour on 11 MWh battery electric power.

Unique E-Flexers

Côte d'Opale
The Côte D'Opale is one of two unique E-Flexer newbuilds. Her design sacrifices cabins completely on Deck 8 in favour of passenger amenities, alongside being outfitted with a so-called "cow catcher" on the bow and sliding doors at the rear. These changes were made in order for her to be suitable for service on the highly intensive Dover-Calais sailing, which only lasts 1 hour 30 minutes and utilises shore-to-ship ramps instead of the conventional ship-to-shore ramps used elsewhere.

Marine Atlantic
The vessel for Marine Atlantic is the second unique E-Flexer. She is expected to carry 1100 passengers and contain 2571 lane metres of vehicle space, and, like the St. Malo Brittany Ferries ships, will be capable of running on marine diesel or liquid natural gas, with hybrid electric propulsion. Like the Brittany ships, the car deck on Deck 7 will be sacrificed for additional cabin space.

Specifications

References

Ships built in China
Ro-ro ships
Ferry classes